A skirt guard, dress guard or coat guard is a device fitted over the rear wheel of a bicycle to prevent a long skirt, coat or other trailing clothes or luggage catching in the wheel, or in the gap between the rim and the brakes.

These guards also help prevent a child's foot becoming entangled in the spokes, when they are seated on a rear child seat or directly on a rear rack.

Skirt guards are common on bicycles in continental Europe, where the bicycle is commonly ridden in smart-casual or formal clothing; but very uncommon in English-speaking countries where many cyclists wear specialised cycling gear. It is often paired with a chain guard to keep the rider's clothing clean. They are often used on utility bicycles.

There are several forms, for instance:
 A length of string may be threaded through holes in the rear mudguard, running radially between the mudguard and the rear dropout.
 A lightweight metal mesh covering the upper half of the rear wheel.
 A fabric mesh or net stretched over the same area.
 A flexible canvas secured over the same area.
 A solid, rigid metal or plastic plate, which can be smaller than a canvas piece.

Large, solid surfaces have the disadvantage of air resistance, which increases the risk of being blown sideways by gusty sidewinds.  Air-permeable designs such as mesh and string provide a more stable ride, but can be more difficult to keep clean.  A pair of small plastic sheets gives moderate air resistance and a smooth surface which is easier to keep clean.

References 

Bicycle parts